The 1982 Tennessee Volunteers football team (variously "Tennessee", "UT" or the "Vols") represented the University of Tennessee in the 1982 NCAA Division I-A football season. Playing as a member of the Southeastern Conference (SEC), the team was led by head coach Johnny Majors, in his sixth year, and played their home games at Neyland Stadium in Knoxville, Tennessee. They finished the season with a record of six wins, five losses and one tie (6–5–1 overall, 3–2–1 in the SEC) and a loss against Iowa in the Peach Bowl. The Volunteers offense scored 281 points while the defense allowed 239 points.

Schedule

Roster

Game summaries

Peach Bowl

Team players drafted into the NFL

References:

References

Tennessee
Tennessee Volunteers football seasons
Tennessee Volunteers football